Deoxypyridinoline, also called D-Pyrilinks, Pyrilinks-D, or deoxyPYD, is one of two pyridinium cross-links that provide structural stiffness to type I collagen found in bones. It is excreted unmetabolized in urine and is a specific marker of bone resorption and osteoclastic activity. It is measured in urine tests and is used along with other bone markers such as alkaline phosphatase, osteocalcin, and N-terminal telopeptide to diagnose bone diseases such as postmenopausal osteoporosis, bone metastasis, and Paget's disease, furthermore, it has been useful in monitoring treatments that contain bone-active agents such as estrogens and bisphosphonates.   

Certain studies have attempted to generate a standardization of Deoxypyridinoline via an individual molar absorptivity value at acid and neutrality pH. The result was  5160 and 5290 L mol−1 cm−1 respectively.

References

Amino acids
Pyridinium compounds